Raid on al-Ghabah was a military expedition of the Islamic Prophet Muhammad that took place in 6AH of the Islamic calendar (i.e. 627 C.E). No orders given by Muhammad in this expedition but Amr ibn al-Akwa attacks Uyanah bin Hisn Al-Fazari after seeing him seize 20 of Muhammad's camels. One Muslim shepherd was killed, and his wife captured.

Event during expedition
When Muhammad returned to Medina after the Invasion of Banu Lahyan. Uyanah bin Hisn Al-Fazari and horsemen of the Banu Ghatafan tribe raided the milch camels of Muhammad. They killed a man from the Banu Ghifar tribe, and kidnapped his wife

Amr ibn al-Akwa noticed what was happening and he followed them, and shot arrows at them and called for help throughout the chase. Muhammad later alerted the people of Medina and sent Muslim cavalry men as reinforcements.

Islamic primary sources

The event is mentioned in Ibn Sa'd's Kitab al-tabaqat al-kabir, Volume 2 

The event is also mentioned by the Muslim scholar Tabari, Volume 8, History of Islam as follows:

See also
List of battles of Muhammad

References

Battles of Muhammad
627
620s conflicts